Smith & Mighty are an English trip hop group from Bristol, England, consisting of Rob Smith and Ray Mighty. Their first releases, in the late 1980s, were breakbeat covers of "Anyone Who Had a Heart" and "Walk On By". Both songs entered the UK Singles Chart. Their work was associated with the Bristol sound, a precursor to trip hop. 

They produced Massive Attack's first single, "Any Love" released in 1988. In 1989, they produced "Wishing on a Star" for Fresh Four, which charted in the UK at number 10.

Discography
Studio albums
 Bass Is Maternal (More Rockers, 1995)
 Big World Small World (Studio !K7, 2000)
 Life Is... (Studio !K7, 2002)
 The Ashley Road Sessions 88-94 (Punch Drunk, 2018)

Compilation albums
 Retrospective (Studio !K7, 2004)
 The Three Stripe Collection 1985-1990 (Bristol Archive Records, 2012)

DJ mix albums
 DJ-Kicks: Smith & Mighty (Studio !K7, 1998)

EPs
 Stepper's Delight (Three Stripe/London/PolyGram, 1992)
 Remember Me (Three Stripe/London/PolyGram, 1994)

Singles
 "Walk On..." (Three Stripe, 1988)
 "Anyone..." (Three Stripe, 1988)
 "Same" (More Rockers, 1996)
 "No Justice" (Studio !K7, 1999)
 "Seeds" (Studio !K7, 1999)
 "Life Has a Way" / "B-Line Fi Blow" (Studio !K7, 2002)
 "Maybe It's Me" (Studio !K7, 2002)

Productions
 Carlton - The Call Is Strong (1990)

Remixes
 Neneh Cherry - "Manchild" (1988)
 M People - "Search for the Hero" (1995)

References

External links
 
 
 

English electronic music groups
Musical groups from Bristol
British musical trios
Trip hop groups